Tony DiLeo (born August 8, 1955) is a former American basketball executive and former coach. He served as the 21st head coach of the Philadelphia 76ers of the NBA, taking over the position mid-season on December 13, 2008 after then-head coach Maurice Cheeks was fired after starting the season with a 9–14 record. The team went 32–27 under DiLeo's leadership (finishing the season 41–41 overall), and lost their Eastern Conference quarterfinals series to the Orlando Magic. At the end of the season, DiLeo withdrew his name from consideration to return as head coach, opting instead to return to the Sixers' front office as senior vice president and assistant general manager. He was promoted to general manager in 2012, but was subsequently removed at the end of the season.

High school
DiLeo was a basketball star at Cinnaminson High School in Cinnaminson Township, New Jersey.

Collegiate career
DiLeo played basketball at Tennessee Tech and La Salle University, where, as a junior, he was named first-team Academic All-American and went on to graduate maxima cum laude from the La Salle School of Business.

Professional career

International basketball
DiLeo was involved international basketball as both a player and a coach. He won nine national titles in the former West Germany's top divisions, seven in the women's (with DJK Agon 08 Düsseldorf) and two in the men's competition (with BSC Saturn Köln), and earned Coach of the Year honors in 1987. He also held the role of West German federation Women's National Coach from 1981 to 1985. While in Europe, he wrote and published the European Basketball Handbook, a guide designed to acclimate American players overseas.

Philadelphia 76ers
DiLeo has been a part of the 76ers basketball operations department since the 1990–91 season. After spending years within the organization in positions including director of scouting and assistant coach, DiLeo notably held the positions of Director of Player Personnel from 1999 to 2003 and was promoted to Senior vice president/assistant general manager in  September 2003.

After the 76ers fired Maurice Cheeks on December 13, 2008, DiLeo was named interim head coach. Taking over the Sixers who had started the season with a 9–14 record, DiLeo managed to finish the 2008–09 season with a 41–41 record. This record was good enough to clinch the Sixers the sixth seed in the Eastern Conference for the playoffs and a matchup with the third seeded Southeast Division champion Orlando Magic. After taking game one of the series, the team lost four of five, including an ugly series-clinching loss in game six. On May 12, it was reported that DiLeo had asked team president and general manager Ed Stefanski to remove his name from consideration to return as head coach. DiLeo opted instead to return to the Sixers' front office as senior vice president and assistant general manager.

In 2012, DiLeo became the 76ers' general manager.

Head coaching record

|- 
| align="left" |Philadelphia
| align="left" |
|59||32||27||.542|| align="center" |2nd in Atlantic||6||2||4||.333
| align="center" |Lost in First Round
|-class="sortbottom"
| align="left" |Career
| ||59||32||27||.542|| ||6||2||4||.333

Personal
DiLeo is married to Anna DiLeo, a former German Olympic and club basketball player, originally from Romania. They have two sons who both play basketball: – T. J., who played college basketball at Temple University, is currently an overseas professional player, while his younger brother Max plays at Monmouth University. The family lives in South Jersey.

References

Living people
1955 births
Basketball coaches from New Jersey
American expatriate basketball people in Germany
Basketball players from New Jersey
BSC Saturn Köln coaches
Cinnaminson High School alumni
La Salle Explorers men's basketball players
People from Cinnaminson Township, New Jersey
Philadelphia 76ers head coaches
Sportspeople from Philadelphia
Tennessee Tech Golden Eagles men's basketball players
American men's basketball players
Basketball players from Philadelphia